Silver Lake is a lake within the Inyo National Forest in Mono County, California, in the United States.

See also
List of lakes in California

References

Inyo National Forest
Lakes of California
Lakes of Mono County, California
Lakes of Northern California
Lakes of the Sierra Nevada (United States)